Hoseynabad (also Romanized as Ḩoseynābād and Hosein Abad) is a village in Kuhsar Rural District, in the Central District of Shazand County, Markazi Province, Iran. At the 2006 census, its population was 482, in 112 families.

References 

Populated places in Shazand County